A Schonwald is the term used in the German state of Baden-Württemberg for a protected woodland area, in which economic usage of the forest is permitted, but under certain restrictions. The term is not used in other German-speaking regions or is at best a colloquial term there.

Schonwald is defined in § 32 of the Baden-Württemberg Forests Act as follows:

A higher level of protection is afforded by the Bannwald, a term which is also recognised outside the state. Within Baden-Württemberg a Bannwald is defined at § 32 of the Forests Act as "a woodland reserve which is left to itself".

See also 
 List of types of formally designated forests
 Schönwald

References

External links 
Woodland reserves at the Baden-Württemberg State Forestry Commission site

Protected areas of Germany
Types of formally designated forests